Milano Domodossola is an underground railway station in Milan, Italy. It is served by the Milan suburban railway service, and by Trenord regional lines. It is a modern station, substituting the nearby, demolished 19th-century Milano Bullona station. The station is located on Via Domodossola.

See also
Railway stations in Milan
Milan suburban railway service

References

External links

Domodossola
Ferrovienord stations
Milan S Lines stations
Railway stations opened in 2003
2003 establishments in Italy
Railway stations in Italy opened in the 21st century